Deborah Swift (born 1955), who has also written  as Davina Blake, is an English writer of historical fiction, based in north west Lancashire.

Her first published novel was The Lady's Slipper (2010), which alludes to the lady's slipper orchid found in the Silverdale area near her home. Levens Hall features as one of the locations of the book, which is set in 1660 and involves the persecution of local Quakers.

The Gilded Lily (2012) follows some of the same characters but moves the location to London and considers aspects of beauty and cosmetics.

A Divided Inheritance (2013) starts in London in 1609 but the action moves to Seville during the expulsion of the Moors and reflects this turbulent period of European history.

Swift's Shadow on the Highway (2014) is the first of The Highway Trilogy of young adult novels, and is based on the life of highwaywoman Katherine Fanshawe, also known as Lady Katherine Ferrers. The second in the trilogy, Spirit of the Highway (2015) is told in the voice of the ghost of a roundhead farmer's son who loved Katherine. Lady of the Highway (2016) completes the trilogy.

Past Encounters (2014), published under the name Davina Blake, is a story set in Carnforth which features the filming of Brief Encounter at Carnforth railway station in 1944 and uncovers a husband's wartime secrets.

Pleasing Mr Pepys (2017) is a " re-imagining of the events" from the diary of Samuel Pepys. It forms a trilogy with A Plague on Mr Pepys (2018) and Entertaining Mr Pepys (2019).

The Occupation (2019) is set on Jersey under German occupation in 1940.

List of works
 The Lady's Slipper (2010,)
 The Gilded Lily (2012,)
 A Divided Inheritance (2013,)
 Past Encounters (as Davina Blake, 2014,)
The Occupation (2019,)

The Highway Trilogy 
 Shadow on the Highway (2014)
 Spirit of the Highway (2015)
 Lady of the Highway (2016)

Mr Pepys trilogy
 Pleasing Mr Pepys (2017)
 A Plague on Mr Pepys (2018)
 Entertaining Mr Pepys (2019)

References

External links
 As Deborah Swift
 As Davina Blake

1955 births
Living people
English historical novelists
Writers from Lancashire
21st-century English novelists
21st-century English women writers